Bogumiłowice refers to the following places in Poland:

 Bogumiłowice, Lesser Poland Voivodeship
 Bogumiłowice, Łódź Voivodeship